Hippea maritima is a bacterium from the genus of Hippea which has been isolated from sediments from a hydrothermal vent from Matupi Harbour in Papua New Guinea.

References

Further reading 
 

 

Campylobacterota
Bacteria described in 1999